Asterivora iochondra is a species of moth in the family Choreutidae. It is endemic to New Zealand and was first described by Edward Meyrick in 1911. This species has been observed in both the North and South Island at Mount Holdsworth and Mount Arthur. This species inhabits open spaces on mountains on the forest edge at 3000 ft altitude. Adults of this species are on the wing in February and flies rapidly in sunshine.

Taxonomy 
This species was first described by Edward Meyrick in 1911, collected by George Hudson at Mount Holdsworth, Tararua Range at 3000 ft in February, and named Simaethis iochondra. George Hudson discussed and illustrated this species in his 1928 publication The butterflies and moths of New Zealand. In 1979 J. S. Dugdale placed this species within the genus Asterivora. In 1988 Dugdale confirmed this placement. The male lectotype specimen is held at the Natural History Museum, London.

Description 

Meyrick described this species as follows:

Distribution
This species is endemic to New Zealand. This species has been observed at the type locality of Mount Holdsworth as well as at Mount Arthur.

Habitat 
This species inhabits open spaces on mountains on the forest edge at around 3000 ft in altitude.

Behaviour 
The adults of this species are on the wing in February. Hudson stated that this species flies rapidly in sunshine.

References

Asterivora
Moths of New Zealand
Endemic fauna of New Zealand
Moths described in 1911
Taxa named by Edward Meyrick
Endemic moths of New Zealand